Henry Loughnan (1849 – 8 June 1939) was a New Zealand cricketer. He played in four first-class matches for Canterbury from 1870 to 1886.

See also
 List of Canterbury representative cricketers

References

External links
 

1849 births
1939 deaths
New Zealand cricketers
Canterbury cricketers
Cricketers from Patna